Mahi Khennane (born 21 October 1936) is a French–Algerian former footballer who represented both the France and Algeria national teams as a striker. In 1967, he was part of the first professional team of FC Lorient, before coming back in Algeria.

Honours

Manager
GC Mascara
Champion of the Algerian Championship: 1984

External links
 Player profile at FFF

References

Living people
1936 births
People from Mascara, Algeria
Association football forwards
Algerian footballers
Algeria international footballers
French footballers
France international footballers
Stade Rennais F.C. players
Nîmes Olympique players
Red Star F.C. players
FC Lorient players
Ligue 1 players
Ligue 2 players
Dual internationalists (football)
GC Mascara players
MC Oran managers
US Saint-Malo players
French football managers
21st-century Algerian people